The Winona Pirates were a Minnesota–Wisconsin League (1909–1912) and Northern League (1913–1914) minor league baseball team based in Winona, Minnesota. They were the first professional team to play in Winona since 1884 and the last until the Winona A's briefly returned in 1958. Hooks Dauss, who won over 200 games at the major league level, played for the Pirates in 1911.

References

Winona, Minnesota
Defunct minor league baseball teams
Professional baseball teams in Minnesota
Baseball teams established in 1909
1909 establishments in Minnesota
Minnesota-Wisconsin League teams
Northern League (1902-71) baseball teams
Defunct baseball teams in Minnesota
Baseball teams disestablished in 1914